The Chichester to Sidlesham Way was a Roman Road between Chichester in South-East England, which as Noviomagus was capital of the Regni, and Sidlesham.

Route
A minor Roman road, it begins at Chichester and terminates at "Streetend" in Sidlesham. Little trace of the road remains today, which originally stretched the four miles between its beginning and terminus.

An Anglo Saxon charter describes a road 'south along Stane Street to Kingsham' which refers to the line running south of the city to the west side of Kingsham Farm. The road then went beyond the Chichester Canal, before passing a little to the east of Streetend Farm.

See also

 Roman Britain
 Roman roads in Britain

References

External links
A map of the known Roman road network in south east England using the Margary numbering system by Keith Briggs. (Chichester to Sidlesham number 156)

Roman roads in England
Archaeological sites in West Sussex